Firm and Happy for the Union is a motto mentioned on Peruvian currency. It first appeared on the gold 8 escudos coin in 1826 and in silver on the 8 reales coin in 1825. It was on all the currencies depicting a silver sun, from the first minted in 1863.

References
Carrey, Émile (1875), Le Pérou (in French), Garnier frères, pg. 2.

Peruvian culture
National mottos